Foreign nobility in Norway refers to foreign persons and families of nobility who in past and present have lived in Norway as well as to non-noble Norwegians who have enjoyed foreign noble status. Although being noble in their native countries, their foreign noble status did not automatically lead to naturalisation when entering the Kingdom. While some immigrant families were naturalised and became a part of the Norwegian nobility and later the Dano-Norwegian nobility, like Wedel-Jarlsberg, others did not apply for or receive a particular recognition, like de Créqui dit la Roche.

General
According to genealogist and nobility expert Henrik Jørgen Huitfeldt-Kaas's list from 1886, Foreign Noble Families without Recognition as Dano-Norwegian Nobility, many of these foreign noble families had lived in Norway since the 16th and 17th century, and a few of their descendants still live in Norway today. Some of these families are also found in the surve Stifts-Relationer, made by Danish genealogist Terkel Klevenfeldt. The survey concerns Norwegian and Danish noble families, reported between 1747 and 1749, based on collected documents from the District Governors and bishops in various parts of Norway.

List of families claiming foreign nobility without naturalization

Literature
 Huitfeldt-Kaas, Henrik Jørgen: «De nulevende adelsslægter i Norge», Historisk Tidsskrift. (1886, 2. rekke, 5. bind, pp. 145–160)
 von Rappe, Otto Friedrich: Innberetning fra stiftamtmann i Aggershus stift, om adelige familier. (1747)
 Biskop N. Dorphs fortegnelse på de adelige familier i Akershus stift. (1749) 
 http://www.hoelseth.com/nobility/nobility_survey.html Dag Trygsland Hoelseth (1999-2010)
 https://web.archive.org/web/20110929003941/http://www.vigerust.net/adel/adel1814_slektsregister.html Tore H. Vigerust: "Alfabetisk register over adelige slekter i Norge omkring 1814"
 https://web.archive.org/web/20120426001735/http://www.wangensteen.net/ht/ht/stiftrelationer/ T. Klevenfeldt: E-book: "Stifts Relationer om Adelige i Danmark og Norge" (1747-1749)
 https://web.archive.org/web/20110929004058/http://www.vigerust.net/adel/adel1886_levende.html Tore H. Vigerust: Adel: H. J. Huitfeldt-Kaas' liste 1886 over påstått "levende adel i Norge"
 https://web.archive.org/web/20110929003647/http://www.vigerust.net/adel/adel1886_fremmed.html Tore H. Vigerust: Adel: H. J. Huitfeldt-Kaas' liste 1886 over "Fremmede Adelsslekter uten anerkjennelse som dansk-norsk adel"
 https://web.archive.org/web/20120111071023/http://www.vigerust.net/adel/adelhovedindex.html Tore H. Vigerust: Adel (Oslo, 2000-2004)

References

Norwegian nobility
Immigration to Norway